Sascha Horvath (born 22 August 1996) is an Austrian professional footballer who plays for LASK. He plays as a central midfielder.

Club career
Horvath is a youth exponent from FK Austria Wien. He made his Bundesliga debut at 3 November 2013 against SC Wiener Neustadt. He replaced Marin Leovac after 80 minutes.

On 3 June 2015, Horvath joined league rivals SK Sturm Graz.

On 30 August 2021, he signed a three-year contract with LASK.

International career
Horvath was born in Austria and is of Croatian descent. He is a youth international for Austria.

Career statistics

References

External links

1996 births
Living people
Association football midfielders
Austrian footballers
Austrian people of Hungarian descent
FK Austria Wien players
SK Sturm Graz players
Dynamo Dresden players
FC Wacker Innsbruck (2002) players
TSV Hartberg players
LASK players
Austrian Football Bundesliga players
Austrian Regionalliga players
2. Bundesliga players
Austria youth international footballers
Austrian expatriate footballers
Expatriate footballers in Germany
Austrian expatriate sportspeople in Germany
Austrian people of Croatian descent
Footballers from Vienna
Austria under-21 international footballers